The 2022 Little Rock Trojans baseball team represented the University of Arkansas at Little Rock during the 2022 NCAA Division I baseball season. The Trojans played their home games at Gary Hogan Field and were led by eighth-year head coach Chris Curry. They were members of the Sun Belt Conference.

Preseason

Signing Day Recruits

Sun Belt Conference Coaches Poll
The Sun Belt Conference Coaches Poll was released on February 9, 2022. Little Rock was picked to finish eighth with 63 votes.

Preseason All-Sun Belt Team & Honors

Miles Smith (USA, Sr, Pitcher)
Hayden Arnold (LR, Sr, Pitcher)
Tyler Tuthill (APP, Jr, Pitcher)
Brandon Talley (LA, Sr, Pitcher)
Caleb Bartolero (TROY, Jr, Catcher)
Jason Swan (GASO, Sr, 1st Base)
Luke Drumheller (APP, Jr, 2nd Base)
Eric Brown (CCU, Jr, Shortstop)
Ben Klutts (ARST, Sr, 3rd Base)
Christian Avant (GASO, Sr, Outfielder)
Josh Smith (GSU, Jr, Outfielder)
Rigsby Mosley (TROY, Sr, Outfielder)
Cameron Jones (GSU, So, Utility)
Noah Ledford (GASO, Jr, Designated Hitter)

Personnel

Schedule and results

{| class="toccolours" width=95% style="clear:both; margin:1.5em auto; text-align:center;"
|-
! colspan=2 style="" | 2022 Little Rock Trojans Baseball Game Log
|-
! colspan=2 style="" | Regular Season (24–26)
|- valign="top"
|

|-
|

|-
|
{| class="wikitable collapsible" style="margin:auto; width:100%; text-align:center; font-size:95%"
! colspan=12 style="padding-left:4em;" | April (8–8)
|-
! Date
! Opponent
! Rank
! Site/Stadium
! Score
! Win
! Loss
! Save
! TV
! Attendance
! Overall Record
! SBC Record
|- align="center" bgcolor=#ffdddd
|Apr. 1 || at Troy || || Riddle–Pace Field • Troy, AL || L4–5 || Stewart(4-1) || Smallwood(2-3) || None || ESPN+ || 1,976 || 11–12 || 1–6 
|- align="center" bgcolor=#ddffdd
|Apr. 2 || at Troy || || Riddle–Pace Field • Troy, AL || W4–3 || Vaught(2-3) || Gamble(0-2) || Smallwood(2) || ESPN+ || 2,153 || 12–12 || 2–6 
|- align="center" bgcolor=#ddffdd
|Apr. 3 || at Troy || || Riddle–Pace Field • Troy, AL || W10–6 || Brewer(2-0) || Witcher(3-2) || Weatherley(1) || ESPN+ || 1,632 || 13–12 || 3–6 
|- align="center" bgcolor=#dddddd
|Apr. 5 || at  || || Torii Hunter Baseball Complex • Pine Bluff, AR || colspan=8| Game postponed
|- align="center" bgcolor=#ddffdd
|Apr. 8 || UT Arlington || || Gary Hogan Field • Little Rock, AR || W5–1 || Arnold(4-2) || King(2-3) || Smallwood(3) || ESPN+ || 132 || 14–12 || 4–6
|- align="center" bgcolor=#ddffdd
|Apr. 9 || UT Arlington || || Gary Hogan Field • Little Rock, AR || W4–3 || Smallwood(3-3) || Novis(0-2) || None || || 292 || 15–12 || 5–6  
|- align="center" bgcolor=#ddffdd
|Apr. 10 || UT Arlington || || Gary Hogan Field • Little Rock, AR || W6–510 || Davis(1-0) || Bailey(3-3) || None || ESPN+ || 353 || 16–12 || 6–6 
|- align="center" bgcolor=#ffdddd
|Apr. 12 || Central Arkansas || || Gary Hogan Field • Little Rock, AR || L5–11 || Haley(1-1) || Davis(0-4) || None || ESPN+ || 186 || 16–13 || 
|- align="center" bgcolor=#ffdddd
|Apr. 14 || Arkansas State || || Gary Hogan Field • Little Rock, AR || L5–6 || Anderson(1-3) || Arnold(4-3) || Jeans(1) || ESPN+ || 358 || 16–14 || 6–7 
|- align="center" bgcolor=#ffdddd
|Apr. 15 || Arkansas State || || Gary Hogan Field • Little Rock, AR || L6–7 || Jeans(1-4) || Vaught(2-4) || None || || 387 || 16–15 || 6–8 
|- align="center" bgcolor=#dddddd
|Apr. 16 || Arkansas State || || Gary Hogan Field • Little Rock, AR || colspan=8| Game cancelled 
|- align="center" bgcolor=#ffdddd
|Apr. 19 || at Louisiana Tech || || J. C. Love Field at Pat Patterson Park • Ruston, LA || L0–10 || Martinez(3-1) || Brewer(2-1) || None || CUSA.TV || 2,186 || 16–16 || 
|- align="center" bgcolor=#ffdddd
|Apr. 22 || at No. 17 Texas State || || Bobcat Ballpark • San Marcos, TX || L2–3 || Wood(4-1) || Arnold(4-4) || Stivors(9) || ESPN+ || 1,236 || 16–17 || 6–9  
|- align="center" bgcolor=#ffdddd
|Apr. 23 || at No. 17 Texas State || || Bobcat Ballpark • San Marcos, TX || L4–30 || Wells(5-1) || Weatherley(1-1) || None || ESPN+ || 1,307 || 16–18 || 6–10 
|- align="center" bgcolor=#ffdddd
|Apr. 24 || at No. 17 Texas State || || Bobcat Ballpark • San Marcos, TX || L2–9 || Dixon(7-0) || Brewer(2-2) || None || ESPN+ || 1,176 || 16–19 || 6–11 
|- align="center" bgcolor=#ddffdd
|Apr. 27 || Louisiana Tech || || Gary Hogan Field • Little Rock, AR || W8–7 || Smallwood(4-3) || Whorff(4-6) || None || ESPN+ || 115 || 17–19 || 
|- align="center" bgcolor=#ddffdd
|Apr. 29 || Louisiana–Monroe || || Gary Hogan Field • Little Rock, AR || W4–3 || Smallwood(5-3) || Wepf(1-4) || Weatherley(2) || ESPN+ || 179 || 18–19 || 7–11
|- align="center" bgcolor=#ddffdd
|Apr. 30 || Louisiana–Monroe || || Gary Hogan Field • Little Rock, AR || W12–9 || Vaught(3-4) || Howell(0-2) || Weatherley(3) || ESPN+ || 194 || 19–19 || 8–11  
|}
|-
|

|-
! colspan=2 style="" | Post-Season (0–1)
|-
|

|}Schedule Source:'''
*Rankings are based on the team's current ranking in the D1Baseball poll.

References

Little Rock
Little Rock Trojans baseball seasons
Little Rock Trojans baseball